Aryeh Yitzhak King (born November 7, 1973) is an Israeli right-wing activist and politician who currently serves as Deputy Mayor of Jerusalem and the founder of the Israel Land Foundation. King is prominent in his activities on Jewish settlement issues in East Jerusalem.

Biography
Aryeh King's parents immigrated from England, and settled on Kibbutz Alumim in the Negev. King enlisted in the Navy, continued his military service in the Givati Brigade, with the rank of lieutenant, and ended up in the "Samson" undercover unit. King holds a bachelor's degree in political science, Islam, and the Middle East from the Hebrew University of Jerusalem. King lives in the Ma'ale HaZeitim neighborhood on the Mount of Olives. He is married to Liska (Shirley) and a father of six.

Political activism
In 1997, he began a public activity centered on attempts to Judaize East Jerusalem, in which he opened the "Bureau of Public Inquiries in East Jerusalem". In 2008, he founded the Israel Land Fund, which works to buy land in the Land of Israel held by Arabs. According to King, the fund was established "in response to a change in the Jewish National Fund's policy, according to which the JNF began assisting in the establishment of an Arab city near Ramallah".

King served as chairman of the National Union of Jerusalem from 2006 to 2012. In the 2008 Jerusalem City Council elections, the representative of the National Union was on a joint list with the Jewish House (NRP), and was placed fifth on the joint list. In the run-up to the elections to the Nineteenth Knesset, the Center Party of Hope chose King for second place among the party's candidates, and it was placed in fourth place on the power list for Israel, which did not pass the blocking percentage.

In 2015, it was reported that King purchased an abandoned church compound on the Jerusalem-Hebron road, near the Al-Arroub refugee camp.

In 2019, King called for the removal of the walls of the Old City of Jerusalem, on the grounds that they were built by a "Muslim tyrant" and that their removal would connect parts of the city.

In February 2022, he clashed with Joint List MKs Ofer Cassif and Ahmed Tibi in Sheikh Jarrah.

During U.S. Secretary of State Anthony Blinken's visit to Jerusalem in March 2022, King called on him leave the capital, tweeting out that Blinken was "not welcome at all" and that it seemed as if he intended to "create provocation".

King’s home in Ma'ale HaZeitim has been repeatedly attacked, including with Molotov cocktails, fireworks, and gunshots.

References

1973 births
Living people
People from Southern District (Israel)
Deputy Mayors of Jerusalem
Israeli political activists
Israeli people of English-Jewish descent
Israeli Orthodox Jews
Jewish Israeli politicians